Jonathan Lee "Jon" Siebels (born August 27, 1979) is an American musician, best known as the guitarist of the band Eve 6. He became a part of the band after meeting bassist and lead vocalist Max Collins during Siebels' freshman year in Crescenta Valley High School.

Siebels was part of a band called Monsters Are Waiting, which played shows in the Los Angeles area before Siebels and another band member left the group.

In 2010, he performed on and co-wrote Hesta Prynn's solo debut EP Can We Go Wrong.

As of March 13, 2011, Siebels was welcomed back to Eve 6 on their official Facebook page.

Siebels is a member of the Party for Socialism and Liberation.

Equipment
Early Setup (2000) 
 Guitars: Guild Bluesbird, Guild S100, Fender Stratocaster Relic
 Effects: Digitech Whammy, Dunlop Wah, Dunlop Rack-mount Wah, Boss GX-700, TCE G-Force, Digital Music Corp GCX Foot Controller
 Amplification: Marshall JCM 800 Head + 4x12 Cabinet, Mesa/Boogie Triple Rectifier + 4x12 Cabinet, Mesa/Boogie Amp Blender

Current Setup
 Guitars: Guild Bluesbird, Guild M-75, Gibson, Fender Blacktop Telecaster
 Effects: Digitech Whammy
 Amplification: Marshall Head + 4x12 Cabinet, Mesa/Boogie Head + 4x12 Cabinet, Blackstar HT Studio 20 Head + 4x12 Marshall Cabinet

References

External links
Monsters Are Waiting

1979 births
Living people
American punk rock guitarists
Eve 6